Brickaville District is an administrative district in Atsinanana Region, Madagascar; also known as Ampasimanolotra and Vohibinany. Brickaville is located along Route nationale 2 (RN 2), 105 km south of Toamasina (the primary seaport of the country) and 220 km east of Antananarivo (the capital).  It is also situated alongside the Rianila river. It is a railway station on the Antananarivo - East Coast line. Its main industries revolve around sugar.

Communes
The district is further divided into 17 communes; which are further sub-divided into 180 villages (fokontany):

 Ambalarondra
 Ambinaninony
 Ambohimanana
 Ampasimbe
 Andekaleka
 Andevoranto
 Anivorano Est
 Anjahamana 
 Brickaville (Vohibinany)
 Fanasana
 Fetraomby
 Lohariandava
 Mahatsara
 Maroseranana
 Ranomafana Est
 Razanaka
 Vohitranivona

Economy
The economy is based on agriculture. Lychee, Rice, coconuts and coffee are grown.
Since 2019 there is also a graphite mine in Fetraomby, the Sahamamy graphite mine.

Roads
There are two mayor roads: the National Road 2 that leads from the capitol Antananarivo to Toamasina and the National Road 11a that leads from its junction with the national road 2 at Antsampanana south to Vatomandry.

References

Districts of Atsinanana